Umberto Branchini (1914-1997) was an Italian boxing promoter and manager. 

Born in Modena, Italy, on 17 July 1914, he promoted or arranged fights on six continents during his career, which lasted for over fifty years. He was elected into the International Boxing Hall of Fame as a "Non-participant" and was also inducted into the World Boxing Hall of Fame in its "Expanded Category".

Branchini handled 10 world champions and 43 European Champions. Amongst the fighters he handled were: Rocky Mattioli, Miguel Angel Cuello, Chartchai Chionoi, Pedro Carrasco, Francesco Damiani, Maurizio Stecca, Francesco De Piccoli, and Salvatore Burruni.

Branchini died on 19 March 1997.

External links
 BoxRec Profile
 International Boxing Hall of Fame Profile

International Boxing Hall of Fame inductees
1914 births
1997 deaths
Businesspeople from Modena
Place of death missing
Sports managers